Brodrick Bunkley (born November 23, 1983) is a former American football nose tackle. He was drafted by the Philadelphia Eagles in the first round of the 2006 NFL Draft. He played college football at Florida State. Bunkley also played for the Denver Broncos and New Orleans Saints.

Early years
A native of Tampa, Florida, Bunkley attended George D. Chamberlain High School. In his senior year, Bunkley contributed  quarterback sacks, while the Chiefs, featuring seniors Brian Clark and Oliver Hoyte, as well as juniors Greg Lee and Joe Clermond, advanced to the Class 5A state finals, where they were upset 21–17 by the Naples Golden Eagles.

Regarded as a four-star recruit by Rivals.com, Bunkley was ranked as the No. 22 defensive tackle nationwide, in a class that was highlighted by Haloti Ngata, Rodrique Wright, and Gabe Watson. After official visits to Michigan State, Florida State, Florida, and Miami (FL), Bunkley chose the Seminoles.

College career
In his true freshman season at Florida State, Bunkley appeared in eight games and totaled 13 tackles, one tackle for loss and three quarterback hurries. In the next-to-last game of the regular season against Florida, Bunkley injured his left knee on an apparent "chop block" by Gators guard Mo Mitchell, which caused him to miss the remainder of the season including the 2003 Sugar Bowl.

As a sophomore, Bunkley played in all 13 games, serving as a back-up to nose guard Jeff Womble. When Womble missed both the Virginia and Wake Forest due to injury, Bunkley stepped in as starter. For the season, Bunkley ranked third among defensive lineman with 38 tackles (19 solo, 19 assisted), including eight for a loss, and also had five QB hurries, two pass break-ups, one and a half sacks and a fumble recovery. Seminoles coaches named him Co-Defensive Newcomer of the Year, along with A. J. Nicholson.

After Womble's graduation, Bunkley took over as starting nose guard in 2004. However, he missed the second half of the season with a severe right high ankle sprain. Having only played in seven games, he finished the year with 12 tackles (three for loss), one sack and one quarterback hurry. He underwent surgery on his ankle after the season and was then ruled academically ineligible in the spring of 2005. He attended summer school, missing a portion of fall camp awaiting his grades.

With his eligibility re-instated, Bunkley started all 13 games at nose guard for the Seminoles. He ranked second nationally in tackles for loss by any defender with 25 (behind only Dan Bazuin's 26.5), thereby establishing a new single-season school record, surpassing Darnell Dockett's 23.5 from the 2001 season. Bunkley also lead the Seminoles with nine sacks, was second on the team in quarterback hurries with 15, and tied for third with 39 solo tackles. He was named a FWAA team first-team All-American and a CNNSI.com first-team All-American.

Professional career

2006 NFL Draft
Projected a first-round pick, Bunkley was praised for his "tremendous first-step quickness" and "nasty attitude". At the NFL Scouting Combine, Bunkley had an impressive 44 repetitions on the 225-pound bench press.

On April 29, 2006, Bunkley was drafted by the Philadelphia Eagles in the first round (14th overall) of the 2006 NFL Draft. He was one of four Florida State Seminoles defensive players taken in the first round of the draft, along with Ernie Sims, Kamerion Wimbley, and Antonio Cromartie. Bunkley was also the highest selected defensive lineman since Corey Simon in 2000.

Philadelphia Eagles
Bunkley held out until August 4, 2006, when he agreed to a six-year contract with the Eagles.

He was the Eagles' second-string defensive tackle during the 2006 season and played sparingly.

On November 19, 2006, Bunkley was suspended by the Eagles for one game as a result of him missing the team flight to Indianapolis.  Bunkley claimed he missed the team flight because he was picking up some fried chicken for the defensive line, as part of a rookie tradition.

In the 2007 season, Bunkley became a starting defensive tackle for the Eagles alongside Mike Patterson.  He recorded 30 tackles and three sacks. After becoming the starter in 2007, Bunkley started in every game in 2008 and 2009. In week 5 of the 2010 season, Bunkley suffered an elbow injury, but managed to play in 14 games.

Denver Broncos
Bunkley was traded to the Cleveland Browns in exchange for a fifth-round pick in the 2012 NFL Draft on July 30, 2011, but the trade was voided after Bunkley did not report. He was instead traded to the Denver Broncos in exchange for an unspecified pick in the 2013 NFL Draft on August 1.

New Orleans Saints
On March 21, 2012, Bunkley agreed to terms on a 5-year, $25 million contract with the New Orleans Saints.

On November 25, 2012, Bunkley was ejected from a game against the San Francisco 49ers when he kicked the 49ers' Alex Boone in the head, after Boone attempted to punch him in the groin. Bunkley was fined $20,000 for his illegal kick.  Bunkley started 15 games for the Saints in 2012 and 10 games in 2013.

In 2014 Bunkley started the first 11 games of the season, but after suffering a quadriceps injury in the Saints' game against Baltimore, he was placed on the injured reserve list on November 27, 2014. The Saints released Bunkley on July 28, 2015, following a failed physical.

NFL statistics

Key
 GP: games played
 COMB: combined tackles
 TOTAL: total tackles
 AST: assisted tackles
 SACK: sacks
 FF: forced fumbles
 FR: fumble recoveries
 FR Yards: Fumble Return Yards
 INT: interceptions
 IR YDS: interception return yards
 AVG IR: average interception return
 LNG: longest interception return
 TD: interceptions returned for touchdown
 PD: passes defensed

References

External links
New Orleans Saints bio
Philadelphia Eagles bio
Florida State Seminoles football bio

1983 births
American football defensive tackles
Denver Broncos players
Florida State Seminoles football players
George D. Chamberlain High School alumni
Living people
New Orleans Saints players
Philadelphia Eagles players
Players of American football from Tampa, Florida